Blue Ridge National Wildlife Refuge is located in the Sierra Nevada, in Tulare County, California. The refuge is one of four units of the Hopper Mountain National Wildlife Refuge Complex for California condors.

Geography
The Blue Ridge National Wildlife Refuge is part of the cooperatively-managed Blue Ridge Wildlife Habitat Area, an  area set aside as an important roosting area located close to historic nesting and foraging habitat for the California condor.  This refuge consists of almost  of coniferous forests dominated by Ponderosa Pine and Incense Cedar.

As of July 2014, there is a total population of 437 condors living in sites in California, Baja California and Arizona. This includes a wild population of 232 and a captive population of 205. 68 free-flying Condors are managed by the US Fish & Wildlife Service in Southern California.

Owners
There are three principal private owners, and four public owners: 
U.S. Fish and Wildlife Service
Bureau of Land Management
USDA Forest Service
California Department of Fish and Game.

References

Blue Ridge National Wildlife Refuge website
 Blue Ridge National Wildlife Refuge profile

External links
Condor Watch The Condor Watch crowdsourcing project, started April 2014.

National Wildlife Refuges in California
Protected areas of the Sierra Nevada (United States)
Protected areas of Tulare County, California
Bureau of Land Management areas in California